The FBI Declassified is an American television documentary series that premiered on October 6, 2020 on CBS.

Episodes

References

External links

2020s American documentary television series
2020 American television series debuts
CBS News
CBS original programming
English-language television shows